Łukowa  is a village in the administrative district of Gmina Nowa Sarzyna, within Leżajsk County, Subcarpathian Voivodeship, in south-eastern Poland.

The village has a population of 610.

References

Villages in Leżajsk County